The Sundance Formation is a western North American sequence of Middle Jurassic to Upper Jurassic age Dating from the Bathonian to the Oxfordian, around 168-157 Ma, It is up to 100 metres thick and consists of marine shale, sandy shale, sandstone, and limestone deposited in the Sundance Sea, an inland sea that covered large parts of western North America during the Middle and early Late Jurassic.

Geology
The Sundance Formation underlies the western North American Morrison Formation, the most fertile source of dinosaur fossils in the Americas, and is separated by a disconformity from the underlying Middle Jurassic Gypsum Springs Formation.

Fossils
The Sundance Formation is known for fossils of an extinct species of marine cephalopod, the belemnite Pachyteuthis densus, as well as several extinct species of oyster, including Deltoideum, Liostrea, and Gryphaea nebrascensis.

Fossil dinosaur 'footprints' on an ancient ocean shoreline are preserved in the formation and protected at the Red Gulch Dinosaur Tracksite, located in the Bureau of Land Management Red Gulch/Alkali National Back Country Byway, near Shell in Big Horn County, Wyoming.

Paleobiota

Vertebrates

Invertebrates

Fish

References

Jurassic geology of South Dakota
Jurassic geology of Wyoming
Jurassic System of North America
Upper Jurassic Series
Geology of the Rocky Mountains
Geologic formations of Montana
Geologic formations of Wyoming
Paleontology in Wyoming

Middle Jurassic Series
Bathonian Stage
Callovian Stage
Oxfordian Stage